Rosvalla IP  is a football stadium in Nyköping, Sweden  and the home stadium for the football team Nyköpings BIS. Rosvalla IP has a total capacity of 1,000 spectators.

References 

Football venues in Sweden